David Poole may refer to:

 David Poole (artist), portrait painter, see Andrew Huxley
 David Poole (dancer) (1925–1991), South African ballet dancer
 David Poole (footballer) (born 1984), English footballer
 David Poole (judge) (1938–2006), English High Court judge
 David Poole (researcher), artificial intelligence and machine learning researcher at University of British Columbia
 David C. Poole (born 1959), British-American physiologist

See also 
 David Pole (1877–1952), British politician
 David Pole (bishop) (died 1568), English Roman Catholic churchman and jurist